Statistics of Second Division Football Tournament in the 2011 season.

Teams
9 teams are competition in the 2011 Second Division Football Tournament, and these teams were divided into 2 groups (5 teams in group A, 4 in group B).

Group A
Club Gaamagu
Club Riverside
Red Line Club
L.T. Sports Club
Hurriyya Sports Club

Group B
J.J. Sports Club
Sports Club Mecano
United Victory
Thoddoo FC

Group stage round
From each group, the top three teams will be advanced for the league round.

Group A
Hurriyya Sports Club, Club Riverside and Red Line Club advanced to the league round as the top three teams of the group.

Group B
United Victory, J.J. Sports Club and Sports Club Mecano advanced to the league round as the top three teams of the group.

Relegation
Team with the worst record among the knocked-out teams from the group stage is relegated to the third division. Thoddoo FC relegated to third division without getting a single point from the group stage.

League round
The top three teams from each group is qualified to this round. As a total of six teams will be playing in this round of the tournament, the team with the highest number of points will be declared as champions. The champion and runner-up team will also play in the Playoff for 2012 Dhivehi League.

Awards

References

External links
Second Division 2011 at RSSSF

Maldivian Second Division Football Tournament seasons
Maldives
Maldives
2